The second season of the Austrian singing competition The Masked Singer Austria premiered on 15 February 2021 on Puls 4. Elke Winkens and Sasa Schwarzjirg, returned as the panelists. Rainer Schönfelder was the new panelist, replacing Nathan Trent. Mirjam Weichselbraun was the new host, replacing Arabella Kiesbauer.

On 22 March 2021, the Babyelefant (singer Sandra Pires) was declared the winner and the Donaunymphe (singer Madita) was the runner-up.

Panelists and host

Guest panelists
Throughout the second season, various guest judges are set to appear alongside Elke Winkens, Rainer Schönfelder, and Sasa Schwarzjirg as the fourth member of the judging panel, for one episode.

The guest panelists that have been included so far:

Contestants

Episodes

Week 1 (15 February)

Week 2 (22 February)

Week 3 (1 March)

Week 4 (8 March)

Week 5 (15 March)

Week 6 (22 March)
 Group number: "Come Together" by The Beatles/"Don't Stop Me Now" by Queen

Reception

Ratings

References

External links
 

2021 Austrian television seasons
Masked Singer